Fairview Cemetery, also known as the Van Buren Cemetery, is a historic cemetery on the east side of Arkansas Highway 59 in Van Buren, Arkansas.  The  cemetery's oldest graves date to 1816, the period of the region's settlement, and include some of Van Buren's first settlers.  First established as an informal private burial ground, it was given to the city by John Drennen in 1846.

Confederate Section 

In 1861 a section in the eastern portion of the cemetery was set aside for burials related to the American Civil War; this section contains 442 known graves of Confederate Army soldiers and eight of Union Army soldiers. Also buried is Confederate Congressman Hugh French Thomason (1826–1893).

The Confederate portion of the cemetery was listed on the National Register of Historic Places in 1996 for its association with the war and commemorative organizations, and the entire cemetery was listed in 2005 for its relevance to the history of area.

See also
 National Register of Historic Places listings in Crawford County, Arkansas

References

External links
 

Cemeteries on the National Register of Historic Places in Arkansas
Buildings and structures completed in 1816
Buildings and structures in Van Buren, Arkansas
1816 establishments in Missouri Territory
National Register of Historic Places in Crawford County, Arkansas
Cemeteries established in the 1810s